JTBC Newsroom is the flagship nightly newscast of South Korean television network JTBC. The newscast is aired from 19:30-20:30 KST and 18:00-18:30 on weekends. JTBC Newsroom replaced two of its predecessors, JTBC News 10 and JTBC News 9. It is presented by Oh Dae-young and Ahn Na-kyung on weekdays, and Han Min-yong on weekends.

History

Etymology
Sohn Suk-hee has clarified that the name of the program has nothing to do with the American drama The Newsroom, which he only watched for about ten minutes. He also pointed out that there are several other programs with the same name, including the ones from BBC News and CNN.

2011: JTBC News 10
It was launched on December 1, 2011, as JTBC News 10, together with the launch of the network itself. It was JTBC's first flagship newscast, which was then hosted by Jun Yong-woo and Cha Ye-rin. Unlike newscasts from the mainstream networks, JTBC News 10 is more focused on providing in-depth stories throughout the program. It was one of the pioneer programs of JTBC that time, usually having a 1% rating according to AGB Nielsen Korea.

November 2012—May 2013: JTBC News 10 becomes JTBC News 9 
On November 5, 2012, major programming revamp happened within the JTBC network. This included a major shift between drama and news programs. Its drama series were moved from 20:45/23:00 to 21:45, and its main newscast, JTBC News 10, became JTBC News 9. JTBC News 10 presenters Jun Yong-woo and Cha Ye-rin were abruptly replaced by Jun Young-gi and Hwang Nam-hee weeks before the 2012 South Korean presidential elections. Although it was titled JTBC News 9, it actually started at 20:50 KST. JTBC News 9 focused on news summaries similar to the mainstream networks, with some exclusive news features. It did not become that popular with viewers, as the newscast was placed third among general cable news programs, behind Channel A's Comprehensive News (now News A) and TV Chosun's News Show Pan (now News Nine).

May 2013: Sohn Suk-hee becomes president of JTBC News, takes over News 9
On May 9, 2013, Sohn Suk-hee was named as the president of JTBC News department. He was considered the most prominent and the most influential news presenter in South Korea, having been with MBC for over three decades before leaving his post on MBC Radio. Another major revamp was made within the entire network programming, including more news and current affairs programs in the line-up, before he assumed the presenter post on 16 September. JTBC News 9 was shown at 20:55. Like its predecessor, JTBC News 10, JTBC News 9 focused more on in-depth reporting, increased live field reports and studio interviews. Its pilot episode rated 1.948%. Its ratings went up from the time that Sohn assumed the presenter post, rating between 1.5% and 2%, and it emerged as the number 1 general cable newscast. This was also the first time a song was used to end the newscast, with Bob Dylan's "The Times They Are a-Changin'" as its first ending theme.

April 2014: Sewol Ferry coverage and the rise in ratings
On April 16, 2014, Sohn's, and the whole network's credibility were tested when one of JTBC's reporters asked a very controversial question to one of the survivors of the Sewol ferry sinking. Sohn apologized on the presenter's behalf during the newscast's opening.

In what could have been a negative effect to the news department, Sohn's sincere apology was praised by viewers and netizens alike. He even became a trending topic on Naver.com after he had a moment of silence while interviewing Baek Jeom-gi, a shipbuilding engineer professor at Busan University.

Ratings of News 9 went up during the coverage of the Sewol ferry accident. On 16 April, it had 1.81% and was the number 1 prime time news program among general cable networks. On 17 April, it went up to 2.5%. Not only it was the number 1 program among general cable stations, it was the only JTBC program which entered the top 20 general cable shows that day.

On 18 April, two days after the incident, Sohn had a ground-breaking interview with the deep sea diving expert Lee Jong-in. He talked the diving bell that could be used for search and rescue operations even in tough water conditions. Lee said that he tried to offer the diving bell and other diving equipment to the South Korean coast guard for its search efforts, but it had been declined. After the interview, online community sites were flooded with criticisms from outraged netizens in response to the government's slow response towards the incident. Several days later, the South Korean coast guard allowed the use of the diving bell. For the first time, JTBC News 9 surpassed the 3% mark, hitting 3.118%.

JTBC News 9 continued to dominate news ratings as it reached a new high of 4.35% on 21 April. Sohn Suk-hee was praised by viewers as he was the only news presenter who covered the search and rescue efforts live from Jindo. The newscast maintained its strength against other general cable newscast for the whole week as it rated 3.97% on the 22nd, 4.12% on the 23rd, 4.079% on the 24th and 3.735% on the 25th. In some cases, its ratings beat the combined ratings of TV Chosun, Maeil Broadcasting Network and Channel A's newscasts.

On 28 April, JTBC News 9 broke its own ratings record, achieving 5.06%, and threatened the main newscasts of MBC and SBS. Its ratings went up on the 29th as it reached 5.401%, beating MBC Newsdesk by 0.001%. So far, JTBC News 9 is the only general cable newscast to reach 5%.

September 2014: JTBC News 9 becomes JTBC Newsroom 
It was announced in the second week of September that JTBC would revamp its news division, and the cancellation of JTBC News 9. It was replaced by JTBC Newsroom on 22 September. JTBC moved its main newscast from 21:00 KST to 20:00 KST, competing directly against MBC Newsdesk and SBS 8 News. To reflect the change, JTBC extended its main newscast from the usual 50 minutes to 100 minutes, a first for Korean television news. JTBC Newsroom focused on more live reports, studio interviews and more in-depth coverage of the day's news. JTBC Newsroom retained Sohn Suk-hee and Kim So-hyun as its presenters. The weekend edition, however, had Jeon Jin-bae and Lee Ji-eun as its new presenters. JTBC Newsroom is split into two parts, the first from 20:00 to 20:55 KST and the second from 21:00 to 21:40. JTBC also revamped its set and graphics package.

The launch of JTBC Newsroom was well received by viewers, rating 2.037% on its first night according to AGB Nielsen Korea, higher than the pilot broadcast of JTBC News 9 when Sohn took over a year before.

October 2016-2017: The Choi Soon-sil tablet PC exposé 

JTBC assembled a special report team on October 3 to dig deeper into the Mir and K-Sports foundations, consisting of the then-weekend presenter and Director of Politics Division 1 Jeon Jin-bae, Director of Social Affairs Division 2 Son Yong-seok and reporters Shim Soo-mi, Kim Pil-joon, Seo Bok-hyun, Shin Hye-won, Kim Tae-young and Park Byung-hyun. Its first scoop was a series of interviews with a former employee who worked with the foundations, which were used as fronts for Choi Soon-sil's bribery operations. The anonymous employee provided testimony and evidence showing Choi met frequently with the various heads of Mir and K-sports.

On October 18, JTBC reported on a tablet PC allegedly belonging to Choi. The network claimed it was found abandoned but, six days later, revealed that it was in possession of the tablet. The contents were revealed over a 20-day period, which included pieces of sensitive government information. JTBC alleged that some members of the Blue House may have supplied Choi the information. Choi then denied the allegations in an interview with the Korean newspaper Segye Ilbo.

Over the next few days, JTBC focused on how Choi meddled with state affairs through showing how Choi edited then-president Park Geun-hye's speeches directly from the tablet, contradicting the original drafts supplied by ex-Blue House staffers. Go Young-tae, who was a former chairman in a company called The Blue K and a close aide to Choi, told JTBC in a June 19 interview that "the only thing Choi does well is to revise the president's speech." However, JTBC found out by examining the tablet that Choi also revised documents of President Park's remarks just hours before a meeting. Some of those former Blue House staffers came forward declaring their knowledge of Choi's involvement. Park apologized to the public on October 25, saying that she "relied on Choi in times of hardship". The same day, JTBC said it had turned over the tablet to prosecutors. At the time, prosecution declared they did not see a reason to investigate Choi, nor could they find her to be summoned for questioning.

On October 26, JTBC revealed digital evidence including e-mail trails of where the tablet files came from and registration information for the tablet, showing Choi probably received them from an ex-Blue House staffer, Kim Han-soo, a close friend of Choi's in-law. JTBC also proved the allegations that the tablet PC was indeed Choi's and that she had connections to what The Hankyoreh called "doorknob triumvirate". The same day, German police announced they had already been in the process of investigating Choi's German businesses and were trying to track her down for questioning over illicit business practices. A JTBC reporter (Lee Ga-hyuk) also ran a live broadcast that day from outside one of Choi's abandoned homes in Germany, knocking on the door and interviewing neighbors. Choi had apparently left her house in a hurry. Later, the prosecution admitted they were aware of Choi having foreign residences and the overseas investigation, contradicting their previous claim of not knowing where she was.

On December 8, a day before Park's impeachment trial, Shim Soo-mi appeared on Newsroom to explain how they obtained the tablet. Shim went to the abandoned office of The Blue K in Sinsa-dong with the real estate manager, who granted them access to the building. Reporters had secured testimony and circumstantial evidence that Choi had been there almost every day until early September. As a result, they found the tablet PC that Choi and Go left behind. The tablet was an early model of the Samsung Galaxy Tab series, which is now discontinued. Shim then bought a charger because the model was old and can't be charged with the current iterations of Samsung's chargers. She then put it back at the desk where she found it, but then suspected that Choi might ask someone to destroy the evidence. After an internal meeting, Shim decided to return to the building and obtain the tablet while copying the files inside it, then submit it to the prosecution. They recognized the crucial effect it could bring to the case. Shim brought it to the special report team's office on October 20, and spent the night with them doing a detailed analysis. The special report team found out that Choi was indeed involved in meddling with state affairs, and planned to submit it to the prosecution on the day their report was shown.

On December 11, prosecution presented concrete evidence that the tablet was indeed used by Choi.

December 2019—March 2020: JTBC Newsroom post-Sohn Suk-hee era 
In December 2019, Sohn Suk-hee announced his resignation as presenter of JTBC Newsroom following a large-scale organization reshuffle. He had held this position for six years and four months, and would only focus on CEO duties. His final day was on January 2, 2020, during the second part of its annual New Year's Day debate. That broadcast recorded a rating of 4.9%. "The Times They Are a-Changin'" was used as its ending theme once more as he resigned from his position.

Seo Bok-hyun was named as his successor, and in his first day as the new presenter of Newsroom on January 6, 2020, he said that he woild "uphold the four principles built on the newsroom" and would "do his best every day". Sohn's departure did not affect Newsroom's ratings, as it recorded a 4.3% nationwide rating on January 6, which is higher than the typical 3.4%-3.5% rating during Sohn's final week. However, weekday ratings fell to 2-4%, falling behind TV Chosun's News 9, while weekend ratings plunged to 1%, placing Newsroom last among its competitors. MBC Newsdesk absorbed all of Newsroom's viewership. Seo was the youngest presenter of a South Korean flagship newscast at 37.

Kim Pil-kyu also left his post on the weekend edition, following a promotion to become a Washington correspondent, making Han Min-yong the only presenter of the Friday to Sunday editions of Newsroom from January 10, 2020. This move made her the first sole female presenter and only the second main female presenter of a flagship JTBC newscast since 2014 (Ahn Chak-hee was the first), as well as one of the only two female presenters of a JTBC news or current affairs program, the other being Overnight Debate's Shin Ye-ri. This edition is shown at 18:55 KST on Saturdays and Sundays from February 15, 2020, making it the first time since 2017 to have its time slot changed. The weekend edition also had its run time shortened to 45 minutes.

On January 28, 2020, JTBC Newsroom's Fact Check segment was certified by the International Fact Checking Network for complying with its principles, making it the first Korean news organization to do so.

The February 23, 2020, broadcast was the last in the Trust B studio before moving to a temporary studio the next day. This marked JTBC's transition from the Trust Building in Digital Media City, which will now be used by JoongAng Ilbo, to the Creation Hall just beside it.

April 2020—June 2021: Move to Creation Hall and reorganizations 
JTBC Newsroom moved to its new headquarters at JTBC Creation Hall at Digital Media City in Sangam-dong, Mapo-gu, South Korea and debuted its new set and graphics package on April 6, 2020. The weekday edition also changed in its background music, as well as the addition of new segments "A Fresh Look" (새로, 세로보다), a similar segment to "Anchor Briefing" with Seo Bok-hyun, and "Dr. Weather" (날씨박사), its first fixed weather segment hosted by the reporter and meteorologist Kim Se-hyun. This broadcast recorded a nationwide rating of 4.145%.

Seo Bok-hyun and Ahn Na-kyung presented the second part of JTBC News' special election coverage titled Our Choice 2020: Ask, Vote. on April 15, 2020. It was the network's first election coverage without Sohn Suk-hee. The live broadcast was also a lead-in to a special edition of Newsroom. Han Min-yong and her former co-presenter Kim Pil-kyu hosted its third part. The second part recorded an average nationwide rating of 1.691%, while the Newsroom special edition received 2.355%. The third part, on the other hand, was the coverage's highest-rated, with a nationwide rating of 2.469%. These numbers were dismal compared to past elections where Sohn was at the forefront.

On the commemoration of the 40th anniversary of the Gwangju Uprising, there was a special edition of Newsroom from Gwangju on May 17–18, 2020. Seo Bok-hyun and Ahn Na-kyung presented from the Gwangju special studio, while Han Min-yong joined them from Sangam-dong. The United Daily News newspaper in Taiwan, considered one of the country's largest, highlighted the effort to emphasize the event's significance in an article posted on its website. The May 17, 2020 broadcast had nationwide ratings of 2.073%, while the May 18 broadcast had 3.149%.

Starting on June 7, 2020, Behind Plus (비하인드+) is also broadcast on Sundays, hosted by former the Behind the News host Park Sung-tae who came from Political Desk and was its main presenter and team leader. The weekday edition was abolished on June 18, 2020, and was Park Min-kyu's last broadcast. It has since been replaced by Won-broadcast (원보가중계), starting on June 22, 2020. The segment is hosted by the former Political Desk National Assembly captain Yang Won-bo and reports on stories with a lighthearted tone. It was established after positive reactions from netizens, stemming from his appearances in the program.

On July 8, 2020, a new segment named "Economic Innovations" (발품경제) began, hosted by Lee Joo-chan of the consumer lifestyle team. He reports on economic-related issues and it is the first economy-centered segment since Saturday Plus and Sunday Plus.

On December 7, 2020, the show once again underwent reorganization with the first time slot change in the weekday edition in six years and a new Fact Check host, Choi Jae-won. He previously hosted the weekend edition of Behind the News before going to the investigative reporting team. Oh Dae-young (social issues), Jung Jae-yoon (international affairs) and Lee Seung-nyeong (economy) joined the show as well as Park Sung-tae (politics), whose "Behind Plus" segment ran on weekends. They are dubbed the "Issue Checkers", and will provide commentary and analysis on issues related to their respective beats. The weekday edition will now from Mondays to Fridays. Kim So-hyun will host a new segment called "Back Briefing", which succeeds "Won-broadcast".

A new youth-centered segment Goose News began on January 26, 2021, as well as a revived Cultural Invitation began on January 30, 2021.

June 2021—present: Seo Bok-hyun leaves Newsroom 
Media Today first reported on May 25 that another large-scale JTBC News reorganization is scheduled to happen on June 7 in an effort to save the show from dismal ratings. Oh Dae-young is set to replace Seo Bok-hyun in the main anchor position, with both Ahn Na-kyung and Han Min-yong retaining their respective positions. Seo is now set to go back to reporting in the field after one year and four months. The newscasts moved temporarily from the Creation Hall studios to the Trust Building open studio to prepare for the reorganization. They debuted a new set and graphics package on June 7, 2021.

Segments 
There are two parts to Newsroom. The first consists of major news and interviews, along with the regular segments Close Camera and Economic Footprints. The second part focuses on the Back Briefing, News Briefing, Fact Check and Dr. Weather segments and other news not covered in the first part. The weekend edition does not follow the two-part format of the weekday edition. Action Camera, Open Mic (Saturday), and Behind Plus (Sundays) are weekend segments. The two-part system on weekdays got abolished following the June 2021 reorganization.

Current segments

Weekdays 
Fact Check (팩트체크) is a regular segment where Choi Jae-won fact-checks statements given by prominent figures, or give an in-depth explanation on a certain topic. This first-ever fact-checking segment became popular with viewers due to its back-to-basics nature, with past hosts including current Washington correspondent Kim Pil-kyu, current anchor Oh Dae-young (who both came from another popular show, Political Desk, with Kim creating the show and Oh serving as its original ruling party leader) and national team reporter Lee Ga-hyuk. Two of this segment's hosts became main anchors of the show. The segment airs every Tuesdays and Thursdays.
Close Camera (밀착 카메라) is a regular segment usually done by reporters from the social issues department (currently Lee Sang-yeop, Lee Ye-won, and Lee Hee-ryeong) on the weekday editions where they report on stories in-depth. Reporters who previously appeared in this segment include Go Suk-seung (former Political Desk opposition leader), Park Min-kyu (former Behind Plus host) and Lee Ga-hyuk (former Fact Check host). This typically appears as the last segment of the first part, but now airs every Mondays, Wednesdays and Fridays toward the end of the show.
Back Briefing (백브리핑) is a segment hosted by former anchor and Blue House reporter Kim So-hyun, which combines the formats of Won-broadcast and Behind Plus. Kim So-hyun left her post on June 3, 2021, with former Political Desk ruling party leader Choi Jong-hyuk succeeding her on June 7.
Goose News (구스뉴스) is a Friday-only segment that debuted on January 26, 2021, where Jeong Jae-woo and Lee Soo-jin deal with concerns related to the youth.
Anchor Comment (앵커코멘트) is a segment inspired by the popular Anchor Briefing segment where anchors add short comments in the form of briefings regarding major issues. It debuted on June 9, 2021.
Next on Newsroom (잠시 후 뉴스룸) is a segment where Ahn Na-kyung previews upcoming reports, with the last item usually previewing the Close Camera segment that will air later in the show.
Tracking Hook (추적보도 훅) is a segment where reporters from different departments investigate major issues in-depth, similar to the Exploration Plus segment during the first few years of Newsroom.
Ending Theme (클로징 BGM) - the broadcast usually ends with a song chosen by the main presenter. This tradition started when Sohn Suk-hee became presenter of JTBC News 9 back in 2013, and has continued on with Seo Bok-hyun succeeding his position in Newsroom, although Sohn and Seo's tastes in music vary differently. This also appears in the weekend edition as well starting February 14, 2020, with songs chosen by the presenter Han Min-yong. Some of the anchors' chosen English-language ending themes have been removed from YouTube due to copyright issues, thus shifting their song choices to Korean-language ones.

Weekends 
 Han Min-yong's Open Mic (한민용의 오픈마이크) is a Saturday-only segment where Han Min-yong usually goes out to conduct in-depth field reports and interviews, similar to Close Camera. Han has expressed that she wanted to change the name of the segment to a different one during a Social Live episode.
News Briefing (뉴스브리핑) is a weekend-only segment where Han Min-yong gives brief summaries of domestic and foreign stories. It used to be part of the weekday Newsroom before the June 2021 reorganization, with Ahn Na-kyung hosting the segment.
Behind Plus (비하인드+) is another regular segment where Park Min-kyu tells Seo Bok-hyun about the process that goes into the reports journalists produce. It is a so-called upgraded version of former segment Behind the News (비하인드뉴스), a popular segment during Sohn Suk-hee's tenure. It has started appearing on Sundays beginning June 7, 2020, hosted by Park Sung-tae, who previously hosted the weekday edition from 2017 to 2019 before he left to host Political Desk. The weekday edition was abolished on June 18, 2020, leaving only the weekend edition to continue airing. It can be omitted when there is breaking news or when there's Cultural Invitation. Jung Jong-moon officially replaced Park Sung-tae as the new host on December 27, 2020, after Park left to become an Issue Checker. Jung Jong-moon left on May 23, 2021, as he was reassigned to the social issues department. Park Jin-kyu is now doing the segment by himself starting May 30, 2021.
Footprint News (발품뉴스), formerly called Economic Footprints (발품경제), is a Saturday-only segment established on July 8, 2020, where Yoon Jung-shik reports on economic-related issues. It is the first economy-centered segment since Saturday Plus and Sunday Plus and is similar to Close Camera. Lee Joo-chan used to present the segment but got assigned to the national department following the June 2021 reorganization.
Cultural Invitation (문화초대석) is an irregular segment where the anchor (currently Han Min-yong) interviews artists, typically situated towards the end of the broadcast. It was a popular segment before its hiatus, and was brought back on the weekends on January 30, 2021, with Cho Sung-jin as the first guest.

Special segments 
 There is an annual debate taking place every start of the New Year, where experts on different sectors talk about the events that may happen on that year. The 2020 edition was also Sohn Suk-hee's final discussion as presenter, leaving the position on January 2, 2020, following the second part of its annual New Year discussion. In the 2021 edition, however, he returned after a year.
There are also urgent discussions held randomly, where the main presenter (currently Seo Bok-hyun) discusses different issues with a panel of experts.

Former segments 
News Keyword (뉴스 키워드) was a segment done by social issues reporter Lee Ji-eun (now in the industry team) where she analyzes a keyword related to a certain issue.
Meticulous Economy (꼼꼼한 경제) was the first economy-centered segment since Newsroom started. It was established with the intention of "providing stories of everyday economics that we are curious about and analyze it for viewers' digestion." It was presented by Sung Hwa-sun and Lee Sae-nu-ri.
Healing Report (힐링 리포트) was where reporters usually deliver positive news. Han Yoon-ji first presented this segment.
Desk Briefing (데스크 브리핑) was where the reporter-in-charge analyzes the cause of an issue and its effect by answering questions from the presenter. Political reporters usually appear in this segment because of the mainly political news presented first. It has since stopped appearing during the 2016 South Korean political scandal.
 There was a segment specific for Lee Kyu-yeon's Spotlight (이규연의 스포트라이트) where viewers are briefed on what is going to be on the episode broadcast that week.
Today (오늘) was a popular Newsroom segment that brings up past events through keywords, pictures and statements.
Live Preview (미리 보는 JTBC 뉴스룸 LIVE) was aired before the start of Newsroom where Ahn Na-kyung gives a preview on what's going to be on the news that day.
Saturday Plus (토요 플러스) and Sunday Plus (일요 플러스) were special segments that became Meticulous Economy's spiritual successors, which aired once a week. It was stopped during the 2016 South Korean political scandal.
Incident Plus (사건플러스) was a segment based on the JTBC News Morning& corner of the same name, which reports on a certain incident in-depth, with reports from all sides of the story. It aired on Thursdays, but was stopped due to the overwhelming workload of the Social Issues Team 3, which produces these reports.
In Today's Newsroom (오늘 뉴스룸에서는) is similar to Live Preview, where Ahn Na-kyung briefs viewers on the news for that day. Exclusives are also previewed in this segment.
Issue Check (이슈체크), later known as Newsroom Keywords (뉴스룸 키워드), was a weekend-limited corner where the presenter Kim Pil-kyu explains a certain story using keywords, mixing commentary and facts. It is similar to Sohn Suk-hee's Anchor Briefing, and A Fresh Look. The name Issue Check would actually be reused for its December reorganization.
Report File 6001 (제보파일 6001) was a weekend-limited segment done by reporters from the Mobile Issue team. The title of this segment is taken from the last four digits of its anonymous tip landline.
Anchor Briefing (앵커브리핑) was a segment where Sohn Suk-hee kicks off the second part of the broadcast with a commentary, similar to how an editorial works in a newspaper. It was one of the most popular segments during Sohn's tenure, and ended on December 31, 2019, before he left the anchor chair. This segment is similar to A Fresh Look.
News Update (뉴스 업데이트) was where reporters would follow up stories that they have previously reported to see if there is anything needed to be followed up with, whether clarifying certain issues, interviewing people involved with it, or summarizing the news that have been reported during the first part.
News Mission (뉴스 미션) was a segment similar to Close Camera where reporters of the Mobile Issue team is tasked to do a mission and check for themselves about contents that piques viewers' curiosity. It is succeeded by Action Camera.
Issue Plus (이슈플러스) was focused on in-depth reporting, similar to Exploration Plus.
Exploration Plus (탐사 플러스) was a recurring segment similar to Close Camera. The Exploration Plus team work closely with the Close Camera team.
A Fresh Look (새로, 세로보다) was a segment presented by Seo Bok-hyun where he opens the newscast with a commentary on a certain issue. It is similar to Sohn Suk-hee's Anchor Briefing segment during his Newsroom tenure, but with a less aggressive approach. It has been suspended to give way to other stories that have been pushed aside due to continuing coverage or to conduct interviews, and was eventually stopped.
Won-broadcast (원보가중계) was a segment done by former Political Desk National Assembly captain Yang Won-bo starting on June 22, 2020, where he tackles on two to three different stories with a lighter tone, reminiscent of his old Dajeonghwe (a nickname for Political Desk) segments. It was established after positive reactions from netizens during his multiple appearances in the program. It kicks off the second part of the weekday edition. 3:10 Relay can be considered the segment's sister program. It is succeeded by Back Briefing.
Issue Check (이슈체크) is a segment established on December 7, 2020, where reporters from different departments explains issues related to their respective beat. There was a segment of the same name and similar nature before hosted by Kim Pil-kyu, but it was later renamed to Newsroom Keywords.
Dr. Weather (날씨박사) is a regular segment where meteorological reporter Kim Se-hyun gives weather forecasts, as well as analysis on weather-related events, typically situated just before the end of the broadcast. It is Newsroom's first fixed weather segment. When there is a major weather report, it can air on weekends, and on the first part during weekdays. If it is omitted on weekdays, it can be replaced by a typical weather brief by the presenter. From August 2020 until December 2020, it is occasionally held on Fridays with Han Min-yong, then integrated with the Friday edition following the December 2020 reorganization. It ended on June 4, 2021.
Action Camera (액션카메라) is a segment similar to Close Camera where reporters from the weekend coverage team cover different social issues. The successor of News Mission, this segment originally premiered on June 7, 2020, but went on hiatus until December 20, 2020.

Broadcast times
JTBC Newsroom is being aired on all cable and satellite systems in South Korea from 19:55 - 21:30 KST. It is also being aired live through the JTBC NOW app, JTBC News's YouTube channel, KakaoTV, Naver TV, and Nate.

Presenters
Note: When the weekday presenter/s is/are absent, the weekend presenter/s replace/s them and vice versa.

Timeline

See also 

 KBS News 9
 MBC Newsdesk
 SBS 8 News

References

South Korean television news shows
JTBC original programming
Korean-language television shows
Flagship evening news shows